Thomas Whitham VC (11 May 1888 – 22 October 1924) was an English recipient of the Victoria Cross, the highest and most prestigious award for gallantry in the face of the enemy that can be awarded to British and Commonwealth forces.

War service
On 25 January 1915, Whitham enlisted in the British Army.  He was 29 years old, and a private in the 1st Battalion, Coldstream Guards, during the First World War when the following deed took place for which he was awarded the VC.

On 31 July 1917 at Pilckem near Ypres, Belgium, during an attack an enemy machine-gun was seen to be enfilading the battalion on the right. Private Whitham on his own initiative immediately worked his way from shell-hole to shell-hole through our own barrage, reached the machine-gun and, although under very heavy fire captured it, together with an officer and two other ranks. This bold action was of great assistance to the battalion and undoubtedly saved many lives.

Post war
After the war he became a bricklayer but he struggled to find work. He was forced to sell his VC and a gold watch that had been presented to him by Burnley council in recognition of his bravery. Both ended up in a pawn shop but were rescued by the council and remain on display in the Towneley Hall Art Gallery & Museums in Burnley.  Thomas died in poverty aged 36. He was buried on 27 October 1924 at Wheatley Lane Inghamite Church. In 1952 a grave memorial was erected for him by the Coldstream Guards association.

In 2008, it was announced that Burnley Schools' Sixth Form would be renamed Thomas Whitham Sixth Form.

A grandson was professional footballer Jack Whitham.

Additional awards
 The 1914-15 Star
 The British War Medal
 The WWI Victory Medal

References

Monuments to Courage (David Harvey, 1999)
The Register of the Victoria Cross (This England, 1997)
VCs of the First World War - Passchendaele 1917 (Stephen Snelling, 1998)

External links
Location of grave and VC medal (Lancashire)

1888 births
1924 deaths
People from Worsthorne
British World War I recipients of the Victoria Cross
Coldstream Guards soldiers
British Army personnel of World War I
British Army recipients of the Victoria Cross
Burials in Lancashire
Military personnel from Lancashire